Juncus secundus, the lopsided rush, one-sided rush, or second rush, is a species of flowering plant in the family Juncaceae, native to eastern North America and introduced to Primorsky Krai in Russia. It is typically found in serpentine, granite, and other barrens.

References

secundus
Flora of Ontario
Flora of Nova Scotia
Flora of Oklahoma
Flora of Missouri
Flora of Illinois
Flora of the Northeastern United States
Flora of the Southeastern United States
Plants described in 1813